Crassispira mindegyiensi is an extinct species of sea snail, a marine gastropod mollusk in the family Pseudomelatomidae, the turrids and allies.

Description

Distribution
Fossils have been found in Miocene strata (Singu Stage) of Myanmar; age range: 28.4 to 23.03 Ma

References

 E. Vredenburg. 1921. Comparative diagnoses of Pleurotomidae from the Tertiary formations of Burma. Records of the Geological Survey of India 53:83-129

mindegyiensi
Gastropods described in 1921